Meath–Westmeath was a parliamentary constituency represented in Dáil Éireann, the lower house of the Irish parliament or Oireachtas from 1937 to 1948. The constituency elected 5 deputies (Teachtaí Dála, commonly known as TDs) to the Dáil, on the system of proportional representation by means of the single transferable vote (PR-STV).

History 
The constituency was created under the Electoral (Revision of Constituencies) Act 1935 for the 1937 general election to the 9th Dáil. It was last used for the 1944 general election to the 12th Dáil.

Meath–Westmeath was abolished under the Electoral (Amendment) Act 1947, and replaced by the two new constituencies of Meath and Longford–Westmeath.

Boundaries 
The 1935 Act defined its area as: "The administrative County of Meath and the administrative County of Westmeath except the portion thereof which is comprised in the County Constituency of Athlone–Longford."

TDs

Elections

1944 general election

1943 general election

1938 general election

1937 general election

See also 
Dáil constituencies
Politics of the Republic of Ireland
Historic Dáil constituencies
Elections in the Republic of Ireland

References

External links
Oireachtas Members Database

Dáil constituencies in the Republic of Ireland (historic)
Historic constituencies in County Meath
Historic constituencies in County Westmeath
1937 establishments in Ireland
1948 disestablishments in Ireland
Constituencies established in 1937
Constituencies disestablished in 1948